The Mazda Hall of Fame Championship was a golf tournament on the LPGA Tour from 1985 to 1986. It was played at the Sweetwater Country Club in Sugar Land, Texas.

Winners
1986 Amy Alcott
1985 Nancy Lopez

References

External links
Tournament results at Golfobserver.com
Sweetwater Country Club

Former LPGA Tour events
Golf in Texas
Sugar Land, Texas
Women's sports in Texas